Fleur de Lis Hotel was a 13th century hotel in the city of Canterbury, Kent, England. It is recorded that Charles Dickens stayed there. The hotel was eventually demolished in 1958.

History

Fleur de Lis was one of the oldest hotels, established over 700 years ago. It was located on 34 High Street, Canterbury, Kent, England. Fleur-de-lis means lily (in French,  and  mean 'flower' and 'lily' respectively) that is used as a decorative design or symbol. 

Parts of the building date back to the 13th century. It is recorded that Charles Dickens stayed there and took his meals in the coffee room overlooking High Street. 

As a hotel, the Fleur de Lis Hotel had single and double bedrooms, and a bar and restaurant that served breakfast, lunch, afternoon tea, and dinner. It was advertised as close to a cathedral, railway stations, and a general post office. 

The hotel is mentioned as early as 1376. In the back of the building was a livery stable and the Fleur de Lis tap, which can be dated to 1372. An engraving from 1808 on a post card shows the 13th century windows in the courtyard of the hotel with carved corbels. The same corbels can be seen in a 1895 photograph that show the back of the building next to The Cherry Tree Freehouse pub on 10 White Horse Lane. 

Thomas Paramore, Esquire of Monkton, Kent said in his will of 1637, that he gave his dwelling called "the Fleur de luce in Canterbury, to his nephew Thomas Paramore, on condition that he paid to the mayor and aldermen 100 pounds and the same to be lent to five poor shopkeepers of the city."

The 1824 city directory said: 

On September 14, 1872, the Mayor's annual banquet was held at the Fleur de Lis Hotel, by the landlord Samuel Prentice. The room was decorated with flowers and plants that were supplied by the Earl of Mountcharles, Captain Lambert, and Mr. Mount. Those that were in attendance were the aldermen and councilors, including Canterbury Mayor George Furley.

In the 20-century, the hotel was used for various functions including city elections and for local society meetings. In 1906, postcards show photographs of the hotel's Coffee Room, lounge, and dining room.  On September 8, 1910, Ben Twyman sold the hotel and several lots. At that time, there was still a livery stable in the back and the Fleur de Lis tap.

The hotel was demolished in 1958. The three-story building that replaced it has two retail stores. Today, the Fleur de Lis tap is the home of the Cherry Tree Freehouse pub at 10 White Horse Lane.

See also
 List of hotels in Kent
List of mayors of Canterbury

References

External links
 
 Fleur de Lis hotel

Hotels in Kent
Listed buildings in Kent
Buildings and structures in Canterbury